Belhassen Aloui (born 17 March 1973) is a Tunisian footballer. He played in eight matches for the Tunisia national football team in 1995 and 1996. He was also named in Tunisia's squad for the 1996 African Cup of Nations tournament.

References

1973 births
Living people
Tunisian footballers
Tunisia international footballers
1996 African Cup of Nations players
Place of birth missing (living people)
Association football forwards
CS Hammam-Lif players
Club Africain players